Absolutely Kosher Records is an independent California-based record label founded in 1998 in San Francisco by Cory Brown.  The label moved to Berkeley in 2002 and then to Emeryville in October 2006 when it partnered with Misra Records.  The two labels remain separate entities.

Absolutely Kosher has been listed on the RIAA website since 2005 as a distributed label of a reporting member (Fontana, the label's distributor). However, the label is not itself a member, and neither pay dues nor corresponds with the RIAA.

On September 20, 2011, a statement from Cory Brown was placed on the label's website informing people that the label would cease to release any more records for the foreseeable future due to financial difficulties.

Bands and artists 

 The Affair
 Azeda Booth
 Bottom of the Hudson
 Franklin Bruno
 Buttonhead
 Chet
 The Court and Spark
 Rob Crow
 The Dead Science
 The Dudley Corporation
 Eltro
 The Ex-Boyfriends
 The Extra Glenns
 Frog Eyes
 The Gang
 Chris Garneau
 Get Him Eat Him
 Goblin Cock
 Jack Hayter
 The Hidden Cameras
 The Jim Yoshii Pile-Up
 Jukeboxer
 Laarks
 Life Without Buildings
 Little Teeth
 The Mountain Goats
 Okay
 Optiganally Yours
 P.E.E.
 Pidgeon
 Pinback
 The Places
 +/-
 The Rollercoaster Project
 60 Watt Kid
 Summer at Shatter Creek
 Sunset Rubdown
 Swords Project
 Sybris
 Telegraph Melts
 Thingy
 Two Guys
 Virginia Dare
 Wax Fang
 Withered Hand
 The Wrens
 Xiu Xiu

See also 
 List of record labels

References

External links 

 
 

American independent record labels
Record labels established in 1998
Record labels disestablished in 2011
1998 establishments in California
2011 disestablishments in California